The Pitcairn Mailwing family was a series of American mail carrier and three-seat sport utility biplane aircraft produced from 1927 to 1931.

Design and development
The Pitcairn Mailwings were developed to carry air mail for the United States Post Office Department. Of simple and robust construction, they had relatively benign flying characteristics.

They were constructed using chrome-moly steel tube and square-section spruce spars with spruce and plywood built-up ribs. The fuselage was faired using wooden formers and covered with fabric. The tail sections were built up from steel tube and fabric-covered. The Pitcairn Mailwing had a ground-adjustable fin and in-flight adjustable tailplane.

The undercarriage was of outrigger type with Oleo-Spring shock absorbers and disc brakes on the mainwheels. All versions looked very similar and changes were minor, with several fuselage extensions being the most obvious.

The mail was carried in a fireproof metal-lined compartment forward of the pilot's cockpit. The Mailwings were flown extensively by the U.S. Air Mail service from 1927 until the end of dedicated Air-Mail routes.

Pitcairn also built the same aircraft in sport versions for private use. These aircraft had the mail compartment removed, and a side-by-side two-seat cockpit was fitted.

Variants

Data from: Aerofiles : Pitcairn

 PA-5 - original production version of 1927 with Wright J-5-9 engine; ATC 18 (32 built)
 PA-5 Mailwing - mail carrier version
 PA-5 Sport Mailwing - sport version with seats for two passengers
 PA-6 - 1928 production version with Wright J-5-9 engine; ATC 2-22 (early), 92 (late) (53 built)
 PA-6 Super Mailwing - mail carrier version
 PA-6B Super Mailwing - (1 converted from PA-6)
 PA-6 Sport Mailwing - sport version with seats for two passengers
 PA-7 - 1929 production version with Wright J-6 engine; ATC 196
 PA-7A Sport Mailwing 
 PA-7M Super Mailwing - mail carrier version (12 built)
 PA-7S Super Sport Mailwing (15 built)
 PA-8 - 1930 production version with Wright J-6 engine; ATC 364
 PA-8M Super Mailwing - mail carrier version (6 built)

Operators
 
 United States Post Office Department
 Howard Hughes owned a PA-5 with a chrome plated engine.
 Felix du Pont owned a PA-5 with gold plated rocker covers.
 Steve McQueen owned a PA-8

Survivors and aircraft on display
PA-5 c/n 1 NC2895   on display at the Air and Space Museum, Washington, DC
PA-5 c/n 9 NC3835 currently on display at the Shannon Air Museum, Fredericksburg, VA
PA-6 c/n 48 NC548K currently on display at the Eagles Mere Air Museum, Laporte, PA
PA-7S c/n 147 NC95W on display at the EAA Aviation Museum, Oshkosh, WI
PA-7S c/n 151 NC13158
PA-6 c/n 159 NC15307 on display at the Old Rhinebeck Aerodrome, Poughkeepsie, NY
PA-8 c/n 164 NC10753
PA-8 c/n 162 NC10751 on display at the Wings of Freedom Aviation Museum, Horsham, PA

Specifications (PA-7M Super Mailwing)

See also

Aircraft of comparable role, configuration and era 
(Partial listing, only covers most numerous types)

Alexander Eaglerock
American Eagle A-101
Brunner-Winkle Bird
Buhl-Verville CA-3 Airster
Command-Aire 3C3
Parks P-1
Spartan C3
Stearman C2 and C3
Swallow New Swallow
Travel Air 2000 and 4000
Waco 10

Related lists 

 List of aircraft
 List of civil aircraft

References

Citations

Bibliography

 
 

1920s United States mailplanes
Mailwing
Single-engined tractor aircraft
Biplanes
Aircraft first flown in 1927